Padamugham is a village in Vathikudy grama panchayat in the taluk of Idukki in the Idukki District in the Indian state of Kerala.

References

Villages in Idukki district